Khura Buri is a district (amphoe) in Phang Nga province in the south of Thailand.

Geography
The district is on the coast of the Andaman Sea as the northernmost district of Phang Nga Province. Neighboring districts are (from the north clockwise): Suk Samran 
of Ranong province; Ban Ta Khun and Phanom of Surat Thani province; and Takua Pa to the south.

To the south of the district is the Si Phang-nga National Park. The Similan Islands, the Surin Islands, and the Mu Ko Ra-Ko Phra Thong National Park consisting of the Ra and Phra Thong Islands.

History
Originally, the district was the capital district of the province Takua Pa, thus named Mueang Takua Pa District. In 1913 the provincial hall was moved to the present-day town of Takua Pa, so the district was renamed Ko Kho Khao after its central tambon. The following year the district was renamed Pak Nam, which was undone in 1917. The district was then reduced to a minor district (king amphoe) on 1 September 1938. After the district office was moved to tambon Khura in 1964, the district was renamed  Khura Buri in 1968. On 8 August 1975 the district was elevated to full district (amphoe) status.

Tambon Ko Kho Khao, originally the center of the district, was transferred to Takua Pa District on 28 December 1988.

Khura Buri District, particularly Ko Phra Thong, has been called a "smuggler's paradise" and thus a key entry point into Thailand for trafficked Rohingya, Uighur, and Syrian refugees.

Administration 
Khura Buri district is divided into four sub-districts (tambons), which are further subdivided into 33 villages (mubans). Khura Buri itself has township (thesaban tambon) status and covers parts of tambons Khura and Mae Nang Khao. Each of the tambons is administered by a tambon administrative organization (TAO). 

The missing number 4 was assigned to tambon Ko Kho Khao, which was transferred to Takua Pa District.

References

External links
amphoe.com
Mu Ko Surin National Park

Khura Buri